is a Japanese women's racing cyclist who currently rides for Luminaria. She won the Japanese National Road Race Championships for women in 2009, the first to win the national title after Miho Oki's eleven straight victories.

References

External links

Official website

1970 births
Living people
Japanese female cyclists
Sportspeople from Shizuoka Prefecture
Cyclists at the 2010 Asian Games
Asian Games competitors for Japan
20th-century Japanese women
21st-century Japanese women